Bobbodji is a village in the commune of Martap, in the Adamawa Region of Cameroon.

Population 
In 1967, Bobbodji contained 223 inhabitants, mainly Kaka people

In the 2005 census, 269 people were counted there.

References

Bibliography
 Jean Boutrais (ed.), Peuples et cultures de l'Adamaoua (Cameroun) : actes du colloque de Ngaoundéré, du 14 au 16 janvier 1992, ORSTOM, Paris ; Ngaoundéré-Anthropos, 1993, 316 p. 
 Dictionnaire des villages de l'Adamaoua, ONAREST, Yaoundé, October 1974, 133 p.

External links
 Martap , on the website Communes et villes unies du Cameroun (CVUC)

Populated places in Adamawa Region